The ODROID is a series of single-board computers and tablet computers created by Hardkernel Co., Ltd., located in South Korea. Even though the name ODROID is a portmanteau of open + Android, the hardware is not actually open source because some parts of the design are retained by the company. Many ODROID systems are capable of running not only Android, but also regular Linux distributions.

Hardware 
Several models of ODROID's have been released by Hardkernel. The first generation was released in 2009, followed by higher specification models.

C models feature an Amlogic system on a chip (SoC), while XU models feature a Samsung Exynos SoC. Both include an ARM central processing unit (CPU) and an on chip graphics processing unit (GPU). CPU architectures include ARMv7-A and ARMv8-A, on board memory range from 1 GB RAM to 4 GiB RAM. Secure Digital SD cards are used to store the operating system and program memory in either the SDHC or MicroSDHC sizes. Most boards have between three and five mixed USB 2.0 or 3.0 slots, HDMI output, and a 3.5 mm jack. Lower level output is provided by a number of general-purpose input/output (GPIO) pins which support common protocols like I²C. Current models have an Gigabit Ethernet (8P8C) port and eMMC module socket.

Specifications

Software

Operating systems

References

External links 
 Official Hardkernel website
 ODROID official forum
 ODROID Wiki
 ODROID Magazine

Single-board computers
Android (operating system) devices
Handheld game consoles
Linux-based devices
Products introduced in 2009
Tablet computers